The Seoul Olympic Museum is a museum dedicated to the 1988 Summer Olympics in Seoul, South Korea. The museum was closed due to renovation from July 2018. It will be reopened in 2020.

See also
List of museums in South Korea
Olympic Park, Seoul

External links
 Seoul Olympic Museum

Museums in Seoul
Olympic museums
Buildings and structures in Songpa District
Olympic Park, Seoul